Vince Ricci (born 1953) is a Republican member of the Montana House of Representatives, representing District 55. He was first elected in 2014 and sworn in in January 2015.

References 

Living people
21st-century American politicians
1953 births
Republican Party members of the Montana House of Representatives